Fast Charlie... the Moonbeam Rider is a 1979 comedy film starring David Carradine and Brenda Vaccaro and directed by Steve Carver.

Plot
Charlie Swattle, a laid-back World War I veteran (and possibly a deserter), swindles his way into the First Intercontinental Motorcycle Race and its hefty $5,000 prize, set to start on July the 4th, 1919.

On his way to the big event, by reason, trick, and force, he reunites his crew of fellow veterans who like him well, but don't trust a word he says. He also meets Grace, who outsmarts him and gets the ownership of his Moonbeam Special motorcycle, so Charlie is forced to take her and her young son with him. Romance ensues, complicated because she doesn't tell the whole truth and he lies all the time.

At the race, Charlie must face the dangers of the road, cutthroat competitors, and the owner of a motorcycle company who will do absolutely anything for his team to win, including offering him a substantial bribe.

So, Charlie is faced with a choice. What will he be, a small-time crook, a big-time crook, or a real winner?

Cast
 David Carradine as Charlie Swattle
 Brenda Vaccaro as Grace Wolf
 L. Q. Jones as Floyd
 R. G. Armstrong as Al Barber
 Terry Kiser as Lester Neal
 Jesse Vint as Calvin Hawk
 Noble Willingham as Pop Bauer
 Ralph James as Bill Bartman
 Bill Bartman as Young Man
 David Hayward II as "Cannonball" McCall
 Whit Clay as Wesley Wolf
 Jack Hunsucker as The Mechanic

Production
The film was originally written for Steve McQueen.

Vaccaro was forced to make the movie under her contract with Universal. "I never would have done it otherwise," she said although she later said doing the movie was "great fun".

Filming took place in July and August 1977 in Oklahoma.

Release

The film had a short drive-in run in the United States, starting on May 4, 1979, and afterward it was broadcast on public and cable television. The film also had releases in Brazil, Sweden, Finland and Portugal between August 1979 to October 1980, and later in video form in Germany, Portugal, Finland, etc.

Reception

Writer and filmmaker Peter Hanson wrote: "The character arc is predictable, and so is the outcome of the cross-country road race that gives the story its structure. Nonetheless, the film’s creative team (...) keeps things lively with an eventful narrative and flashes of colorful dialogue."

Senior Critic from Geek Vibes Nation Dillon Gonzales wrote: "Fast Charlie… The Moonbeam Rider is a bit of a shaggy dog of a feature, but it has its fair share of charm to win you over in the end. David Carradine is a dynamic leading man with his wit and charm, but it is Brenda Vaccaro who ends up elevating the emotional and human elements of the story. A better balance could have been found between the interpersonal drama and the motorcycle exploits, but the film rarely leaves you feeling bored.

Award-winning playwright, screenwriter, and film journalist Frank J. Avella wrote: "But the heart of this darkish comedy is Charlie's journey towards redemption and it's a mostly engaging one with a trio of terrific character actors (L.Q. Jones, R.G. Armstrong, Terry Kiser) providing support and Vaccaro excelling in the early part of the film (...) Carradine's performance is a delight and rather subversive. It's reminiscent of his own troubled film, "Americana" (...) Charlie is a deserter and a grifter, yet we sympathize with him. And a great deal of that is due to Carradine's onscreen charm."

Home Media

The film was first released on VHS in the late 1980s. In 2022 was remastered and released in DVD and Blu-ray format by Kino Lorber, including audio commentary by film historian Eddy Von Mueller, theatrical trailer (newly mastered in 2K), and optional English subtitles.

Notes

References

Further reading

External links
 New York Times Movies
 
 Fast Charlie... the Moonbeam Rider at the Internet Movie Database

1979 films
1979 comedy films
American auto racing films
American comedy films
Motorcycle racing films
Films set in the 1920s
Films about veterans
Films scored by Stu Phillips
Films directed by Steve Carver
Universal Pictures films
1970s English-language films
1970s American films